Sturgills is an unincorporated community in the Helton Township of Ashe County, North Carolina, United States, near the border with the state of Virginia.

History
Sturgills was named for a former Sheriff B. Sturgills, who was instrumental in the founding of the community's former post office .

References

Unincorporated communities in Ashe County, North Carolina
Unincorporated communities in North Carolina